Gardner Creek may refer to:

Gardner Creek (Mill Creek tributary), in Luzerne County, Pennsylvania, USA
Gardner Creek, New Brunswick, New Brunswick, Canada
Gardner Creek (Susquehanna River tributary), in Lackawanna County, Pennsylvania, USA